Arthur Dixon may refer to:

Arthur Dixon (Texas, Politician) (1996–)
Arthur Dixon (Chicago alderman) (1837–1917)
Arthur Dixon Elementary School, a public elementary school in Chicago, IL
Arthur J. Dixon (1919–2007),  former member of the Legislative Assembly of Alberta
Arthur Dixon (footballer, born 1892) (1892–1965), English footballer who played for Rangers F.C.
Arthur Dixon (footballer, born 1867) (1867–1933), English footballer who played for Aston Villa F.C.
Arthur Dixon (footballer, born 1879) (1879–1946), English footballer who played for Burnley F.C.
Arthur Dixon (footballer, born 1887) (1887–1964), English footballer who played for Plymouth Argyle F.C.
Arthur Dixon (footballer, born 1921) (1921–2006), English footballer for Northampton Town and Leicester City
Arthur Lee Dixon (1867–1955), British mathematician and academic
Arthur Stansfield Dixon (1856–1929), English metal worker and architect
J. Arthur Dixon (1897–1958), British founder of the eponymous postcard and greetings card company
Arthur Dixon, master of the SS Magdapur, mined and sunk in 1939 off Thorpeness, Suffolk